Andiceras is an enigmatic perisphinctacean ammonite belonging to the neocomitid subfamily Berriasellinae. Andiceras was named by Krantz in 1926 and is known from Tithonian sediments in Argentina and the Chinameca and La Caja Formations, Mexico.

References 

Jurassic ammonites of South America
Jurassic Argentina
Fossils of Argentina
Jurassic ammonites of North America
Jurassic Mexico
Fossils of Mexico
Fossil taxa described in 1926